MTV, the first and most popular music television network in the U.S. has a long history of hosting live music events in which awards are presented. Along with MTV's related channels around the world, the network produces over 20 award shows annually. This list of MTV award shows links to further information about each of these shows.

MTV award shows in the U.S. 
NOTE:  Includes all MTV networks.
CMT Music Awards (1967–present*)
Acquired by MTV Networks in May 2000.  Originally known as the Music City News Awards when founded in 1967.
MTV Video Music Award (1984~present)
BET Soul Train Awards (1987-2007, 2009-present)
Acquired by Paramount Global in 2016.
MTV Movie & TV Awards (1992~present)
MTVU Woodie Awards (2004~present)
MTV Fandom Awards (2014~2017)

MTV award shows around the world

Current shows
MTV Europe Music Award
MTV Millennial Awards
MTV Millennial Awards Brazil
MTV Video Music Awards Japan
MTV Africa Music Awards
TIM MTV Awards

Previous awards shows
MTV Video Music Brazil
Los Premios MTV Latinoamérica
MTV Asia Awards
MTV Australia Awards
MTV Italian Music Awards
MTV Immies (and its related Gimmies)
MTV Israel Music Awards
MTV Mandarin Music Awards
MTV Mandarin Music Honors
MTV Pakistan Music Video Awards
Penghargaan MTV Indonesia
MTV Pilipinas Music Award
MTV Romania Music Awards
MTV Russia Music Awards
MTV Student Voice Awards (Japan)
TMF Awards

Movies
MTV Movie Awards Mexico
MTV Asia Movie Awards
MTV Indonesia Movie Awards
MTV Russia Movie Awards

Fashion
MTV India Style Awards
MTV China Style Awards
MTV Philippines Style Awards
Fashionista Mtv (Latin America)

Video games
MTV Game Awards (Germany)
MTV Game Awards (Mexico)

References

External links
 MTV Asia Awards
 MTV Australia Vidqwqweeo Music Awards
 MTV Europe Music Awards
 MTV India Immies
 MTV Mandarin Music Awards
 MTV Penghargaan
 MTV Pilipinas
 MTV Romania Music Awards
 MTV Russia Music Awards
 MTV Video Music Awards
 MTV Video Music Brasil Awards
 MTV Video Music Awards Japan
 MTV Video Music Awards Latin America
 MTVU Woodie Awards
 TMF Awards
 TRL Awards USA
 MTV Movie Awards
 MTV Movie Awards Latin America
 MTV Asia Movie Awards
 MTV Indonesia Movie Awards
 MTV Russia Movie Awards
 MTV India Style Awards
 MTV China Style Awards
 MTV India GIMMIES
 MTV Game Awards

MTV
MTV award shows
American television-related lists
American music-related lists